The whitecheek surgeonfish, also known as the goldenrim surgeonfish or yellow-spotted surgeonfish (Acanthurus nigricans), is a reef-associated tang found from the central Indo-Pacific area to the eastern Pacific coast, Hawaii included. It occasionally makes its way into the aquarium trade. It grows to 21.3 cm in length.

References

External links

 
 

Acanthuridae
Acanthurus
Fish of Hawaii
Fish described in 1758
Taxa named by Carl Linnaeus